The Kahua language is a member of the family of San Cristobal languages, and is spoken in the southern part of the island of Makira, formerly known as San Cristobal in Solomon Islands. It has also been called Anganiwai, Narihua, Wanoni.

External links 
 Materials on Kahua are included in the open access Arthur Capell collections (AC1 and AC2) held by Paradisec.

References

Languages of the Solomon Islands
Malaita-San Cristobal languages